The Mayor of Cumilla City is the chief executive of the Cumilla City Corporation. The Mayor's office administers all city services, public property, most public agencies, and enforces all city and state laws within Cumilla city.

The Mayor's office is located in Nagar Bhaban; it has jurisdiction over all 27 wards of Cumilla City..

List of officeholders 
Political parties

Elections

Election result 2022

Election result 2017

Election result 2012

References

Mayors of Comilla
Mayors of places in Bangladesh
Comilla City Corporation